Let the Love Begin may refer to:

Let the Love Begin (film), a 2005 Philippine film
 "Let the Love Begin", a 2005 song by Kyla and the film's theme song
Let the Love Begin (TV series), a 2015 Philippine TV series
 "Let the Love Begin", a song from the 1986 American movie Thrashin'
 "Let The Love Begin", an English-language version of the Mónica Naranjo song "De Qué Me Sirve Ya" from Bad Girls